The Act of Uniformity Amendment Act 1872 (35 & 36 Vict. c. 35), sometimes called the Shortened Services Act, was an Act of the Parliament of the United Kingdom that amended some of the provisions of the English Act of Uniformity 1662 (14 Car. 2 c. 4).

It allowed certain modifications 
 a shortened form of Morning and Evening Prayer on week days
 on special occasions approved by the Ordinary special forms of service, provided that they contain nothing, except anthems or hymns, which did not form part of the Holy Scriptures or the 1662 Book of Common Prayer
 additional forms of service on Sundays and Holy-days in addition to the regular services, approved by the Ordinary
 the use of Morning Prayer, the Litany, and the Communion Service as separate services and in varying order
 sermons or lectures without the common prayers or services appointed by the Prayer Book

The Act was repealed by section 6 of, and the second schedule to the Church of England (Worship and Doctrine) Measure 1974 (1974 No. 3).

See also
Prayer Book (Tables of Lessons) Act 1871
Burial Laws Amendment Act 1880

References

External links
Text of the Act

United Kingdom Acts of Parliament 1872
1872 in Christianity
History of Christianity in the United Kingdom
Law about religion in the United Kingdom